Kurt Rosenfeld (1 February 1877 – 25 September 1943) was a German lawyer and politician (SPD).   He was a member of the national parliament ("Reichstag") between 1920 and 1932.

Early life
Kurt Samuel Rosenfeld was born at Marienwerder, a mid-sized town near Danzig, then in West Prussia into a Jewish family. Between 1896 and 1899 he studied jurisprudence and social economics at Freiburg (where one of his teachers was Max Weber), then moving on to Berlin from where he emerged in 1905 with a doctorate in law. After this he took a job as a lawyer in Berlin. While still a student he joined the Social Democratic Party ("Sozialdemokratische Partei Deutschlands" / SPD).

Political activity prior and during the First World War
Between 1910 and 1920 he served as a Berlin city councillor.   For most of this time he was on the left wing of the SPD.   He was also building a reputation as a trial lawyer: during this period he defended in court like minded political comrades including Rosa Luxemburg, Kurt Eisner and Georg Ledebour.   Other left wing Berlin politicians in his circle included Clara Zetkin, Karl Liebknecht, Franz Mehring, Karl Radek and Anton Pannekoek.

Between 5 August 1914 and 9 November 1918, Kurt Rosenfeld took part in the First World War as a soldier.   He was nevertheless one of those in the SPD who had opposed the party leadership's 1914 decision to agree a political truce at the outbreak of the war and, more specifically, to vote in favour of "war credits".  As the scale of the human slaughter on the front line and of the economic destitution on the home front mounted, the number of SPD politicians opposing the war increased, and it was primarily over this issue that the party split in 1917.  Rosenfeld was among those who formed the breakaway faction, which now became the Independent Social Democratic Party of Germany ("Unabhängige Sozialdemokratische Partei Deutschlands" / USPD).

German Revolution
During the year of revolution that followed the war Rosenfeld served briefly, between November 1918 and January 1919, as Prussia's regional justice minister. In 1919 he was elected to the Prussian State Assembly ("Preußische Landesversammlung"), the body mandated to devise and enact a constitution for what was called at that point the Free State of Prussia ("Freistaat Preußen"). Developments in Prussia were replicated at a national level. The emperor had abdicated in November 1918, and a body known (because it was convened at Weimar) as the Weimar National Assembly was mandated to devise a new democratic constitution for a democratic state. The constitutional assembly's work was by now almost concluded, but on 21 May it was dissolved, to be replaced by a national parliament ("Reichstag"). Rosenfeld was a USPD candidate at the general election two weeks later, and was elected, representing Electoral District 13 (Thuringia). He was now re-elected in successive elections, remaining a Reichstag member till 1932.

SPD activism 1922-1931

The Independent Social Democratic Party of Germany ("Unabhängige Sozialdemokratische Partei Deutschlands" / USPD), having been the product of a split in 1917, itself broke apart at the end of 1920 when the majority joined the new German Communist Party.   Kurt Rosenfeld was part of the minority that stayed within a much diminished USPD, but the arguments continued.   Following the assassination of Walther Rathenau in 1922, many took the view that in the post war context of economic destitution, the residual USPD now had too much in common with the  SPD to persist as a separate movement.  Kurt Rosenfeld, Theodor Liebknecht and Georg Ledebour were the most high-profile USPD opponents of any political reunification, but when, in September 1922 the political parties nevertheless formally remerged, Rosenfeld (unlike the other two) went along with the USPD majority.

After 1922 Rosenfeld's was positioned firmly on the left wing of the SPD, together with colleagues such as Paul Levi and Max Seydewitz.  From 1927 he was one of the SPD left wingers producing "Klassenkampf" (Class Struggle"), a rather theoretical Marxist journal produced under the auspices of the SPD.   As the political temperature rose in the later 1920s, Rosenfeld was one of those urging closer collaboration between the SPD and the Communists as a way to counter the growing menace of right wing demagoguery.   In March 1931 he was one of the left wing Reichstag members who voted against the naval budget.   He also continued to work as a leading defence attorney.   Of particular note was his defence of Carl von Ossietzky in the 1931 "Weltbühne" case.

Socialist Workers' Party activism 1931-1933
In 1931 Rosenfeld was one of six left wing SPD members of parliament excluded from the SPD group in the Reichstag following a "breach of party discipline".  At the heart of the disagreement was the decision of the party leadership under Otto Wels to "tolerate" the Brüning government, in a desperate - and with the benefit of hindsight unsuccessful - attempt to "stabilize the tottering state" and avert a Nazi take-over.   Rosenfeld and fellow-expellee Max Seydewitz now founded the Socialist Workers' Party ("Sozialistische Arbeiterpartei Deutschlands" / SAPD).   Rosenfeld and Seydewitz became co-chairmen of the new party serving in the post, in Rosenfeld's case, till the early part of 1933.

In exile
Early in 1933 Rosenfeld resigned from the SAPD and called on fellow members to link up with the Communist Party. However, the political backdrop had been transformed  in January 1933 when the Nazi Party took power and converted Germany into a one-party dictatorship. At the end of February the Reichstag fire was instantly blamed on the Communists, and in March 1933 Communist members were expelled from the Reichstag which was in any case rendered irrelevant by enabling legislation that allowed the government to rule without parliamentary consent.  Communists began to be arrested:  Kurt Rosenfeld was one of those who managed to escape to Paris which was rapidly becoming the informal headquarters of the German Communist Party in exile. He set up a Paris-based anti-fascist press agency called "Agence Impress".
In Germany the Reichstag fire in February 1933 was quickly followed by a trial which was given maximum publicity by the Nazi government in order to blacken the reputation of the Communists and provide justification for the post-democratic changes that the government had implemented.   Outside Germany a number of political refugees organised an alternative "counter-trial" in London which took place in September 1933, and concluded that the real perpetrators of the Reichstag fire were the Nazi elite.   Kurt Rosenfeld was one of those involved in the London "counter-trial" which received much press coverage in English-speaking parts of the world.   However, by the end of 1934 he had made his home not in London but in the United States where he worked closely with exiled German communists.   It seems likely that at some stage he himself joined the exiled German Communist Party.

In the US he was able to do some work as a lawyer.   He also teamed up with Gerhart Eisler to produce, from 1941, a German language news journal "The German-American".   He also became president of the "German American Emergency Committee/Conference", which was part of a wider campaign to unite German and German-speaking opponents to the Hitler regime across the American continent.  In 1943 he also became honorary president of the Latin American Committee of a Free Germany.   However, in September 1943 he died at his home Queens, New York.

References

People from West Prussia
People from Kwidzyn
20th-century German lawyers
Members of the Weimar National Assembly
Members of the Reichstag of the Weimar Republic
People of the German Revolution of 1918–1919
Jewish socialists
Jewish emigrants from Nazi Germany to France
Jewish emigrants from Nazi Germany to the United States
Social Democratic Party of Germany politicians
Independent Social Democratic Party politicians
Socialist Workers' Party of Germany politicians
1877 births
1943 deaths
Jurists from Berlin
Justice ministers of Prussia